The 1892 All-Ireland Senior Hurling Championship was the sixth staging of the All-Ireland hurling championship since its establishment by the Gaelic Athletic Association in 1887. The championship began on 30 October 1892 and ended on 26 March 1893.

Kerry were the defending champions, however, they were defeated in the provincial series. Cork won the All-Ireland title, after defeating Dublin by 2-3 to 1-5 in the final.

Rule changes

At the Gaelic Athletic Association's (GAA) annual congress held in Thurles on 13 January 1892, some changes were made to the existing rules of the game.  Firstly, a goal was made equal to five points.  Secondly, teams were reduced from twenty-one to seventeen players.  Perhaps most importantly of all, it was also decided that county champions, when representing the county, were allowed to select players from other clubs within the county.

Teams

A total of just three teams contested the championship, the fewest participants since the inaugural championship.

Team summaries

Results

Munster Senior Hurling Championship

All-Ireland Senior Hurling Championship

Championship statistics

Miscellaneous

 The All-Ireland final between Cork and Dublin is the first championship meeting between the two teams. The game ended in disarray as the Dublin players walked off with five minutes left in the match following a dispute over a goal.

Sources

 Corry, Eoghan, The GAA Book of Lists (Hodder Headline Ireland, 2005).
 Donegan, Des, The Complete Handbook of Gaelic Games (DBA Publications Limited, 2005).

External links
 [www.hurlingstats.ie/competition/code/AIHC/1892 1892 All-Ireland Hurling Championship results]

References

1892